Bóthar is a charity operating in Ireland and the United Kingdom specialising in assisting farmers in developing countries to become self-sufficient by giving them livestock. The charity began in 1989 and sent its first animals in 1991. It is an affiliate of Heifer International.

History

Foundation 
T. J. Maher, a politician, farmer and company director, co-founded Bóthar and served as its first chairman. Peter Ireton was also a founder. Members of the inaugural board included former Archbishop of Cashel and Emly, Dermot Clifford and then Church of Ireland Bishop of Limerick, Edward Darling.

Programs 
Starting in 1991, the charity initially focused on sending dairy cows to developing nations in Africa. However, in 1996, the bovine spongiform encephalopathy (BSE) crisis brought a halt to heifer airlifts for several years. During this period, the only animals that Bóthar sent abroad were dairy goats. However Bóthar continued to send veterinary supplies, vehicles, artificial insemination straws and training literature. Bóthar investigated whether other countries needed assistance and researched other types of farm animals they could work with. This subsequently led to the establishment of chicken and pig projects in Cameroon.

Bóthar later established bee projects in five African countries (Ghana, Tanzania, Uganda, Cameroon and Zambia), a breeding yak programme in Tibet, and a rabbit programme in China. Following the lifting of embargoes after later foot and mouth outbreaks in Ireland, the heifer programme was expanded to include Cameroon, Rwanda, Uganda, Lebanon, Malawi, Albania and Kosovo. Goats were sent by Bóthar to Tanzania, Kenya, Lebanon, Mozambique, Poland, Uganda and Gambia.

Alleged misappropriation of funds and continued activity 
In October 2020, the Charities Regulator appointed inspectors in to carry out a statutory investigation into the charity. In April 2021, Bóthar claimed before the High Court that former chief executive, David Moloney, misappropriated hundreds of thousands of euro donated to it for his own and his associate's personal use. The charity secured a temporary High Court injunction, whereby Moloney's assets were frozen. Bóthar claimed that an ongoing investigation into his conduct revealed that he was "guilty of an egregious breach of trust and an appalling dereliction of his duty to Bóthar and the beneficiaries of its charitable objects". Counsel for Bóthar said it was their case that Moloney did not co-operate with the investigations regarding the alleged misconduct. He was suspended from his role as CEO in November 2020, and resigned from his post in February 2021. Counsel said that as far as Bóthar were concerned, the resignation was an attempt by Moloney to prevent various matters from being uncovered. The judge granted Bóthar the temporary freezing order on an ex-parte basis. The judge, who also expressed concerns regarding the costs the charity would incur due to the litigation against Moloney, granted Bóthar permission to seek orders which required the defendant to provide a list of the full value or interest he held in any assets which he possessed. Bóthar was granted permission to seek an order requiring Moloney to provide details of funds donated to the charity that it was alleged he used for his own benefit or the benefit of third parties. 

Also in April 2021, David Moloney admitted to misappropriating funds from the charity and concocting payments to the amount of an estimated €769,000. In a hearing before the High Court it was stated that this misappropriation occurred over the eight years he had been CEO and a period before that. Moloney admitted to misappropriating these funds along with the (by then deceased) Bóthar founder Peter Ireton. Ireton had been found dead at his home several weeks before the hearing. In the hearing, the High Court was told the funds had been obtained by falsifying donations to charity projects, with the recipients of these donations claiming they were never received. In one instance, Moloney admitted that a payment of €127,000 was made to an English company Agricultural Innovation Consultants Limited for a project in Rwanda had never been carried out. Moloney also admitted to fraudulently paying €100,000 of the charity's funds to one of his three pension funds and using €10,000 to purchase a hayshed on a farm he owns. The High Court was informed funds were also spent on providing staff cash bonuses of which the charity's board was not informed. Bóthar claimed that a high-profile event held in 2016 to mark the-then 25th anniversary of the organisation's foundation was used by Moloney to steal €37,200 from the charity.

In May 2021, Fianna Fáil TD John Lahart described the revelations as a "crushing blow" and, raising concerns of "corruption" within charities, stated that "we find ourselves back at the same point again, not due to the corporate outlook or objectives of an organisation, but because of the greed of a few". In response, Minister of State at the Department of Rural & Community Development, Joe O'Brien, stated that "the Charities Regulator has been engaging with Bóthar since early 2020 on foot of concerns which were raised about the charity. [..] As the Deputy may be aware, however, a criminal investigation is now under way into activities at Bóthar".

Gardaí contacted police in Britain regarding the allegations of fraud at the charity. Detectives with the Garda National Bureau of Fraud Investigations were expected to expand their inquiries into Africa and the UK for missing funds. As of May 2021, detectives with the Garda National Bureau of Fraud Investigations expected to expand their inquiries into Africa and the UK for missing funds as more allegations of fraud at the charity. In June 2021, it was reported that Heifer International, an affiliate organisation of Bóthar which is located in the USA, was reviewing its partnership with Bóthar. Also in June 2021, Moloney applied for free legal aid to cover the legal expenses of the proceedings brought against him by the charity.

In July 2021, Bóthar made a High Court application to pursue a civil case against the estate of the late Peter Ireton, regarding the matter of allegedly stolen donor funds. In October 2021, Bóthar received High Court approval to pursue a claim against the estate of Ireton. Justice Senan Allen agreed to allow the charity to join the personal representative of Ireton’s estate in civil proceedings, where it sought to recover at least €1.1m it believed had been misappropriated. 

Seeking to rebuild, the charity recruited new, unpaid, volunteer board members in January and February 2022, and, in May 2022, announced its opening for the recruitment of a new, permanent CEO. The charity remained active in projects in four countries during this period. In February 2022, it exported 22 in-calf dairy heifers to Kosovo, eastern Europe, having transported 54 in-calf dairy heifers and 130 goats in November and December 2021 respectively. The new CEO would be "tasked with carrying out a full analysis into past income at the charity" and would also have responsibility to ensure the organisation’s “financial integrity and accountability” through “sound controls and financial reporting”. 

In July 2022, Chartered Accountants Ireland (CAI) reportedly opened an investigation into the company's long-time auditor, Grant Thornton. The investigation followed a complaint received by the professional body from one of its members and was said to be at an early stage. It is due to establish if there exists sufficient grounds to proceed to the disciplinary stage.

See also 
Heifer International

References

External links 
 

Development charities based in the Republic of Ireland
Charity scandals
Organizations established in 1989
1989 establishments in Ireland